Chamaesphecia tenthrediniformis is a moth of the family Sesiidae. It is found in Europe and the Near East. It strongly resembles Chamaesphecia empiformis, some sources classify both as one species.

The length of the forewings is 6–10 mm. The moth flies from May to July depending on the location.

The larvae feed on Euphorbia esula.

External links
Vlindernet 
waarneming.nl 
Lepidoptera of Belgium

Sesiidae
Moths described in 1775
Moths of Europe
Moths of Asia